Lamarque may refer to:

Geography
Lamarque, Argentina, a town in the province of Río Negro, Argentina
Lamarque, Gironde, a commune in the French department of Gironde
La Marque, Texas (formerly Lamarque), a city in the U.S. state of Texas
Lamarque-Pontacq, a commune in the French department of Hautes-Pyrénées
Lamarque-Rustaing, a commune in the French department of Hautes-Pyrénées

People
Jean Maximilien Lamarque, a French commander during the Napoleonic Wars who later became a member of French Parliament
Jim LaMarque, Negro league baseball player
Libertad Lamarque, actress
Peter Lamarque, philosopher